Hinrich Brunsberg, also Heinrich Brunsberg or Henryk Brunsberg, (1350 in State of the Teutonic Order – between 1428 and 1435 presumably in Szczecin) was a German architect who shaped the medieval Brick Gothic style in eastern northern Germany. He worked around 1400, especially in the Margraviate of Brandenburg and in the Duchy of Pomerania.

Life 
Brunsberg was born around 1350 in the Baltic region. It is assumed that he came from the town of Braniewo. In 1372, he acquired citizenship in Gdansk, where there is evidence of land ownership in his name in 1378. Around 1400, he was mentioned for the first time in the liber qurelarum of the city of Szczecin. With the year 1401, an inscription on the north chapel of St. Catherine's Church in the  names him as the master builder of the church building. The last mention in the ecclesiastical abandonment books of Stettin dates from 1428. Presumably he died there soon afterwards, but at the latest in 1435 after the completion of the Marienkapelle at St. Catherine's Church in Brandenburg.

Buildings 
 
 Cathedral Basilica of St. James the Apostle, Szczecin
 Umbau des Rathauses Stettin (destroyed by the effects of war as early as 1677)
 Cathedral Basilica of St. James the Apostle, Szczecin
 St. Mary's Church, Stargard
  in Chojna
 Rathaus in Königsberg in der Neumark
 Marienkirche in Poznań

References

Further reading 
 Deutsches Kulturforum östliches Europa e.V.: INNOVATION UND TRADITION. HINRICH BRUNSBERG und die spätgotische Backsteinarchitektur in Pommern und der Mark Brandenburg. Übersetzung aus dem Polnischen: Katrin Adler. Berlin, Großbeeren 2014, 
   
 Max Säume: Hinrich Brunsberg, ein spätgotischer Baumeister. In . Neue Folge vol. 28, Leon Saunier, Stettin 1926, 
 Nikolaus Zaske: Hinrich Brunsberg. In Ule Lammert (ed.): Große Baumeister. Berlin 1990, vol. 2, pp. 9 ff., 

German architects
15th-century architects
Gothic architects
Date of birth unknown
Date of death unknown
People from the State of the Teutonic Order